Louis Carré (7 January 1925 – 10 June 2002) was a Belgian football player and coach. As a player, Carré played at both professional and international levels as a midfielder, before becoming a football coach.

Career
Carré played at club level for RFC de Liège between 1945 and 1959, making 402 appearances.

Carré also played at international level for Belgium, earning 56 caps between 1948 and 1958, and participating at the 1954 FIFA World Cup.

Carré later became a football coach, and managed RFC de Liège briefly in 1982.

References

1925 births
2002 deaths
Belgian footballers
Belgian football managers
Belgium international footballers
1954 FIFA World Cup players
RFC Liège players
RFC Liège managers
Footballers from Liège
Walloon sportspeople
Association football midfielders